Cyclone is the eighth studio album by Tangerine Dream and the first in their canon to feature proper vocals and lyrics. The cover is a painting by band leader Edgar Froese.

Other Tangerine Dream albums to later include vocals are Tyger (1987), Madcap's Flaming Duty (2007) and Under Cover – Chapter One (2010). 

Cyclone reached number 37 on the UK album charts.

Track listing

Personnel
 Edgar Froese – synthesizers, Mellotron, Moog synthesizer, electric guitars, acoustic guitar
 Christopher Franke – Moog, music sequencer, mellotron, synthesizers, electronic drum
 Steve Jolliffe – vocals, flute, piccolo, cor anglais, bass clarinet, Hohner clavinet, synthesizers, grand piano, Fender Rhodes, electric violin, tenor horns, soprano horns, lyricon
 Klaus Krüger – polyester custom-built drums with multi-trigger unit, electronic drum, Paiste cymbals, bubims, Burma gong set

Equipment
Oberheim Electronics 8 Voice polyphonic synth, twin keyboard Mellotron Mark V, ARP Instruments Digital Soloist synth, Moog synthesizer & Projekt Electronic Time Control System, Gibson Les Paul custom guitars, Korg PS 3100 polyphonic synth, Roland Corporation GS 500 guitar & GR 500 controller, ARP Solina string Ensemble, Ovation Acoustic guitar, Project Electronic sequencer, Computerstudio digital sequencer, loop Mellotron, ARP Soloist synth, Generalmusic Elka string synth, Oberheim music sequencer OB-1 one, Hohner clavinet, Grand piano, Fender Rhodes, Roland System-100 synth, bass clarinet, cor anglais, tenor & soprano horns, C-flute, lyricon by Computone, Polyester custom-built drums with multi-trigger unit, electronic drum, Paiste cymbals, bubims, Burma gong set.

Charts

References

1978 albums
Tangerine Dream albums
Virgin Records albums